Moon is an unincorporated community in Morgan County, Kentucky, United States. It lies along Kentucky Route 172 northeast of the city of West Liberty, Kentucky, the county seat of Morgan County.  Its elevation is 755 feet (230 m).  The community's post office, with the ZIP code of 41457, closed in 1997.

References

Unincorporated communities in Morgan County, Kentucky
Unincorporated communities in Kentucky